Limnonectes longchuanensis is a species of fanged frogs in the family Dicroglossidae. It is endemic to Yunnan, China (in Husa 户撒, Longchuan County and Yingjiang County) and Myanmar (in Kachin State, Sagaing Division, and Chin State).

It is part of the Limnonectes kuhlii complex. It is found in evergreen forests along hillside streams.

References

 Suwannapoom, Yuan, Chen, Hou, Zhao, Wang, Nguyen, Murphy, Sullivan, McLeod & Che, 2016 : Taxonomic revision of the Chinese Limnonectes (Anura, Dicroglossidae) with the description of a new species from China and Myanmar. Zootaxa, .

Amphibians of China
Amphibians of Myanmar
longchuanensis
Amphibians described in 2016